Storey Hall, located at 342–344 Swanston Street in Melbourne, Australia, is part of the RMIT City campus of the Royal Melbourne Institute of Technology (RMIT University). It consists of a grand meeting hall constructed in 1887, extended and renovated in 1996, providing a large upper hall, the lower hall as home to RMIT Gallery First Site, and a range of lecture theatres and seminar rooms.

The 19th century hall was built by the Ancient Order of Hibernians, and known as Hibernian Hall. In the early 20th century it was put to a range of uses, until it was   acquired by RMIT in 1957 The hall was named after the Storey family; John Storey (Junior), who founded the RMIT Student Union in 1944, and Sir John Storey (Senior), who left a large bequest to RMIT in order to found the John Storey Junior Memorial Scholarships in memory of his son, whose studies were cut short in 1947 when he died of leukaemia at age 22.

A major refurbishment and addition was completed in 1996 to the design of Ashton Raggatt McDougall. The design of the new works is colourful and angular, employing Penrose tiles to create the patterned facade and the refurbished interior of the original auditorium.

The ground level of the original hall houses the RMIT First Site Gallery, which is operated by the RMIT Union, and has a focus on new media, as well as a cafe named re:vault.

Architecture
One of the key influences in the design of the Storey Hall annex is the use of Penrose’s tiling pattern, developed by Roger Penrose. The street façade is a version of the historic hall next door, its basic shapes of arch below and window above transformed by applying the Penrose pattern. The precast Penrose patterned tiles incorporate the impression of ruffles, keys and suspender belts to represent the Suffragettes, who once occupied used the original hall.  The colours of purple and green also reflect those of the women's liberation movement, with the green, used more extensively inside, referring to the Hibernian Hall’s construction by the Irish community of Melbourne. The foyer contains off-form concrete walls and columns with a curved stairwell. The main auditorium’s ceiling and large areas of wall are composed of geometric Penrose tile patterns in green and white.

Storey Hall is both architecturally and historically significant as it has won numerous awards and combines both the historical and traditional aspects of the former Hibernian Hall to create a complex and daring building.
 
Storey Hall could be said to represent the Deconstructivism strain of  postmodern architecture, and contrasts for instance with the more ordered and facade of RMIT Building 8 on the other side of Storey Hall.

The Storey Hall refurbishment was one of the first buildings in Melbourne to use computer and digital fabrication, necessary to produce the complex yet mathematical elements of the architecture.

Gallery

Awards
RAIA National Interior Architecture Award, 1996

RAIA Victorian Architecture Medal, 1996

RAIA William Wardell Award for Institutional Architecture, 1996

RAIA Marion Mahony Award for Interior Architecture, 1996

National Award – Dulux Colour Awards, 1996

Notes

References

External links

 Architecture Australia Storey Hall Review

RMIT University buildings
Buildings and structures in Melbourne City Centre
Cultural infrastructure completed in 1887
1887 establishments in Australia